Route 303 is a collector road in the Canadian province of Nova Scotia.

It is located in Digby County and connects the Bay Ferries Limited terminal at Pollys Point where the ferry to Saint John, New Brunswick docks, with Conway at Exit 26 on Highway 101.

Communities
Conway
Digby

See also
List of Nova Scotia provincial highways

References

Nova Scotia provincial highways
Roads in Digby County, Nova Scotia